Scotland Bridge, also known as Boone County Bridge #41, is a historic segmental arch bridge located at Clinton Township, Boone County, Indiana.  It was built 1901 and rebuilt in 1908, and is a 120-foot-long, three-span bridge built of Indiana limestone.

It was listed on the National Register of Historic Places in 1994.

References

External links

Road bridges on the National Register of Historic Places in Indiana
Bridges completed in 1901
Transportation buildings and structures in Boone County, Indiana
National Register of Historic Places in Boone County, Indiana
Stone arch bridges in the United States